The 1920–21 Drexel Blue and Gold men's basketball team represented Drexel Institute of Art, Science and Industry during the 1920–21 men's basketball season. The Blue and Gold, led by 1st year head coach William McAvoy, played their home games at Main Building.

Roster

Schedule

|-
!colspan=9 style="background:#F8B800; color:#002663;"| Regular season
|-

Note: All games, except the last 6, are listed out of order

References

Drexel Dragons men's basketball seasons
Drexel
1920 in sports in Pennsylvania
1921 in sports in Pennsylvania